Maryinka may refer to:
Marinka, Ukraine, a town in Donetsk Oblast, Ukraine
Maryinka, name of several rural settlements in Russia